The 1902 Oregon gubernatorial election took place on June 2, 1902 to elect the governor of the U.S. state of Oregon. The election matched Republican W. J. Furnish against Democrat George Earle Chamberlain.

The Republican Party nominating convention was held on April 2, 1906. Incumbent governor Theodore Thurston Geer and C. A. Johns of Baker City had withdrawn their candidacy, and mayor of Pendleton W. J. Furnish was nominated on the first ballot against H. E. Ankeny of Jackson County.

Results

References

Gubernatorial
1902
Oregon
June 1902 events